Walt Landers is a former running back in the National Football League.

Biography
Landers was born Walter James Landers on July 4, 1953 in Lanett, Alabama.

Career
Landers played two seasons with the Green Bay Packers from 1978 to 1980. He played at the collegiate level at Clark Atlanta University.

See also
List of Green Bay Packers players

References

1953 births
Living people
People from Lanett, Alabama
Players of American football from Alabama
Green Bay Packers players
American football running backs
Clark Atlanta Panthers football players